Eremophila arenaria is a plant in the figwort family, Scrophulariaceae and is endemic to arid parts of central Australia. It is a small shrub with purple flowers and is thought to grow only on sand dunes in South Australia, the Northern Territory and Western Australia.

Description
It has many resin glands on the branches and leaves, making them very sticky bright green and glossy.

The petal tube is purple with black streaks and the inside of the tube is hairy. There are four stamens which do not extend beyond the end of the tube.

Taxonomy and naming
Eremophila arenaria was first formally described by Robert Chinnock in 2007 and the description was published in Eremophila and allied genera : a monograph of the plant family Myoporaceae. The specific epithet (arenaria) is derived from the "Latin arenaria, growing on sand".

Distribution and habitat
This eremophila occurs in the south-western corner of the Northern Territory, the far north-west of South Australia and the eastern part of Western Australian in the Great Victoria Desert biogeographic region where it grows on sand dunes.

Conservation status
Eremophila arenaria is classified as "data deficient" by the Government of the Northern Territory and as "not threatened" by the Government of Western Australia Department of Parks and Wildlife.

Use in horticulture
Reflecting its natural habitat, this species needs well-drained soil, prefers full sun and can survive long periods without water. It is also very frost tolerant. It is usually grown from cuttings but needs to be grafted onto Myoporum if not to be grown in sand.

References

arenaria
Flora of the Northern Territory
Flora of Queensland
Flora of South Australia
Plants described in 2007
appressa